Richard "Mörtel" Lugner (born 11 October 1932) is an Austrian entrepreneur in the construction industry, a Viennese society figure, and a former political candidate not affiliated with any of the Austrian political parties.

Early life and family 
Richard Lugner is the son of the lawyer Richard Lugner senior, who went missing in 1943 after becoming a prisoner of war in Russia during WWII.

Business career 
Born in Vienna, Lugner got a licence to work as a building contractor (Baumeisterkonzession) in 1962 and at first specialized in the erection of filling stations and the renovation of old buildings. His company started to prosper, and he eventually became known to a wider public with the completion, in 1979, of Vienna's first mosque, situated on the banks of the river Danube.

In 1990, he opened his own shopping mall, Lugner City, in a working class district of Vienna and, from the start, aggressively advertised his business by regularly inviting celebrities—starting with Thomas Gottschalk—who would perform there and sign autographs—a marketing strategy not very common in a city that, back then, hardly had any shopping malls. Through his shopping mall, Lugner was one of a small group of businesspeople who helped change Austrians' shopping habits by pushing to the limits the various regulations concerning opening hours. In a city where shops generally closed at 6 p.m. Mondays to Fridays and at noon on Saturdays to remain closed for more than one and a half days until Monday morning, Lugner strongly advocated late night shopping on at least one weekday and an extension of shopping hours to Saturday afternoon, even when that meant raising the trades unions' opposition.

Celebrities 
 In 1992, Mörtel Lugner and Mausi Lugner (his former wife Christina) brought Harry Belafonte to Lugner City, and also took him along to the Vienna Opera Ball. From that time on, the couple have each year paid a celebrity to visit the shopping centre and then accompany them as their guest to that prestigious function at the Vienna State Opera, an "invitation" which has often been criticised or just belittled for being a nouveau riche idea.

Political ambitions 

In the late 1990s, Lugner handed over his business to his two grown-up sons by an earlier marriage, Alexander and Andreas Lugner, and went into politics. In the 1998 presidential elections, he finished fourth in a field of five candidates, receiving 9.91 percent of the popular vote;  incumbent Federal President Thomas Klestil, who had been running for a second term of office, received 63.4%. For the parliamentary elections that took place the following year, the Lugners organised a separate platform called Die Unabhängigen ("The Independents") but, as they only received 1.02 per cent of the vote, did not get any seats in the Nationalrat. Nevertheless, at the end of the millennium, a survey found that more than 90 per cent of Austrians recognized the name Lugner. For the 2016 presidential election he announced to collect the necessary signatures in order to participate.

Personal life 
In September 2014, Lugner (aged 81) married German Playboy model Cathy Schmitz (aged 24) at a ceremony held at the Schönbrunn Palace in Vienna. Schmitz was a Playboy Bunny at the Playboy Club in Cologne before being the cover model of German Playboy in 2013. Lugner had been married four times before.

Lugner has four children: His two sons, Alexander and Andreas Lugner, are from his first marriage. He has another child, Nadin, from a marriage to actress Sonja Jeannine. His youngest child, daughter Jacqueline (aged 21 in 2014), is from his fourth marriage.

Die Lugners ("The Lugners") was a reality TV show produced by a private television broadcaster which showed Richard and Christina Lugner, their daughter Jacqueline (born 1993), and Richard Lugner's mother-in-law, Martha Haidinger, at home, at work and on holiday.

References

External links 

Official website

1932 births
Living people
Austrian businesspeople
Candidates for President of Austria